"To Be a Pilgrim" (also known as "He Who Would Valiant Be") is an English Christian hymn using words of John Bunyan in The Pilgrim's Progress. It first appeared in Part 2 of The Pilgrim's Progress, written in 1684.

The words were modified extensively by Percy Dearmer for the 1906 The English Hymnal. 
At the same time it was given a new tune by British composer Ralph Vaughan Williams, who used a melody taken from the traditional song "Our Captain Cried All Hands" which he collected in  the hamlet of  Monk's Gate in West Sussex – hence the name of "Monks Gate" by which the melody is referred to in hymn books.

The hymn has also been sung to the melody "Moab" (John Roberts, 1870) and "St Dunstans" (Charles W. Douglas, 1917).

For a time, Bunyan's original version was not commonly sung in churches, perhaps because of the references to "hobgoblin" and "foul fiend." However, one commentator has said: "Bunyan's burly song strikes a new and welcome note in our Hymnal. The quaint sincerity of the words stirs us out of our easygoing dull Christianity to the thrill of great adventure." Recent hymn books have tended to return to the original, for example, the Church of England's Common Praise and the Church of Scotland's Church Hymnary 4th Edition (Hymns of Glory, Songs of Praise).

Textual variants

Uses 

The hymn's refrain "to be a pilgrim" has entered the language and has been used in the title of a number of books dealing with pilgrimage in a literal or spiritual sense.

School hymn
 UK: Royal Grammar School, Guildford, Newcastle Grammar School, Derby Grammar School, Westcliff High School for Girls, Dartford Grammar School, Cardinal Vaughan Memorial School, Reigate Grammar School, former Pilgrim School, Bedford, Caistor Grammar School, Lord Wandsworth College, Haberdashers' Aske's Boys' School, The Ladies’ College, Norwich High School for Girls GDST, North London Collegiate School, Woodberry Down Comprehensive School, Taunton prep school.
 Canada: St. Clement's School (Toronto), Elmwood School (Ottawa) and Ashbury College
 Nigeria: Hope Waddell Training Institution
 US: Saint Sebastian's School

Films, TV and radio
 Opening scene of the 1962 film Term of Trial 
 Lindsay Anderson's 1968 film "if....", characterising the traditional religious education of an English public school of the time
 1986 film Clockwise starring John Cleese 
 Richard Attenborough's 1977 World War II film, A Bridge Too Far
 Doctor Who episodes
"Human Nature" and "The Family of Blood", 2007
 Last episodes of Season 3, foreshadowing the Tenth Doctor's meeting with the Master
 Radio play by Rachel Joyce, broadcast as the BBC Radio 4 afternoon play. It won the Tinniswood Award in 2007 for best original drama.
 In the TV version of The Midwich Cuckoos, it's the school song for the Blackout Children.

Miscellaneous
"To be a Pilgrim" has been adopted by the British Special Air Service as their battle hymn.

 State funeral of former British prime minister Winston Churchill on January 30, 1965.
 Funeral of former British prime minister Margaret Thatcher on April 17, 2013, in the English Hymnal version.  It was one of her favourite hymns.
Thanksgiving Service 2022 of Prince Philip, Duke of Edinburgh, in Westminster Abbey, 29 March 2022. The hymn was played as the Queen took her seat in the Abbey.
 Selected by Tony Benn as one of his choices on BBC Radio 4's Desert Island Discs in January 1989.
 An episode of the Australian soap opera Neighbours in 2019.
 The Frankenstein Chronicles, Season 1, Episode 5, circa minute 41

Notable recordings 

 Maddy Prior and The Carnival Band – album Sing Lustily And With Good Courage. 
 Lesley Duncan and Joyce Everson in 1973 on the GM Label in England.

References and notes

External links 

 He Who Would Valiant Be, John Bunyan
He Who Would Valiant Be - Winston Churchill's Funeral - UK Parliament Living Heritage
 
 Monk's Gate MIDI file
 He Who Would Valiant Be (YouTube video.)
 A verse sung to the melody Monk's Gate

John Bunyan
English Christian hymns
17th-century hymns